United Airlines Flight 585 was a scheduled passenger flight on March 3, 1991, from Denver to Colorado Springs, Colorado, carrying 20 passengers and 5 crew members on board.  The plane experienced a rudder hardover while on final approach to runway 35 at Colorado Springs Municipal Airport, causing the plane to roll over and enter an uncontrolled dive.  All 25 people on board were killed.

The NTSB was initially unable to resolve the cause of the crash, but after similar accidents and incidents involving Boeing 737 aircraft, the crash was determined to be caused by a defect in the design of the 737's rudder power control unit.

Aircraft and flight crew
Flight 585 was operated by a Boeing 737-291, registered .  The 737 was originally manufactured for the "old" Frontier Airlines in 1982 and was acquired by United Airlines in 1986 when the former went out of business (a new airline company with the same name formed eight years later).  On the date of the accident, the aircraft had accumulated approximately 26,000 flight hours. 

The flight crew consisted of Captain Harold Leon Green (51), First Officer Patricia Karen Eidson (42), and 3 flight attendants, including Lisa Laraine Newland-Church (21). The captain, who had over 10,000 hours as a United Airlines pilot (including 1,732 hours on the Boeing 737), was regarded by colleagues as a conservative pilot who always followed standard operating procedures. The first officer had accumulated over 4,000 flight hours (including 1,077 hours on the Boeing 737), and she was considered by Captain Green to be a very competent pilot.

On February 25, 1991, the aircraft was flying at  when the rudder abruptly deflected 10 degrees to the right. The crew on board reduced power and the aircraft returned to normal flight. A similar event occurred two days later. Four days later, the aircraft crashed.

Accident
Flight 585 was a regularly scheduled United Airlines Flight, originating at General Wayne A. Downing Peoria International Airport in Peoria, Illinois to Colorado Springs, Colorado, making intermediate stops at Quad City International Airport in Moline, Illinois, with an intended final destination of the now-decommissioned Stapleton International Airport in Denver, Colorado, at 09:46 Mountain Standard Time (16:46 UTC).  On March 3, 1991, the flight operated from Peoria to Denver without incident.

At 09:23 (16:23 UTC), Flight 585 departed Denver with 20 passengers and 5 crew members on board. The flight crew added  to their approach landing reference target airspeed based on this information.

Eidson replied, "Sounds adventurous... United five eighty-five, thank you."

The crew was unable to locate the traffic, but 37 seconds after it was reported, the tower informed the flight that the traffic was now behind them.

At 09:41:23 (16:41:23 UTC), air traffic control directed Flight 585 to hold short of runway 30 for departing traffic. Eidson replied "We'll hold short of three-zero, United five eighty five." This was the last transmission received from the flight.

At 09:42 (16:42 UTC), about 20 seconds prior to the crash, the aircraft entered into a controlled 20-degree bank and turn for alignment with the runway.

Within the next four seconds, at 09:43:33 (16:43:33 UTC), the aircraft suddenly rolled to the right, heading rate increasing to about 5-degrees per second as a result, nearly twice that of a standard rate turn, and pitched nose down. Flight Officer Eidson stated "Oh God, [flip]!", and in the same moment Captain Green called for 15-degrees of flaps while increasing thrust, in an attempt to initiate a go-around. The aircraft was destroyed on impact and by the post-crash fire. Segments of the 737 were buried deep within this crater, requiring excavation. Everyone on board was killed instantly. The aircraft narrowly missed a row of apartments, and a little girl standing in the doorway of one of these apartments was knocked backwards by the force of the explosion, hitting her head, but she was released from a local hospital with no further issues after treatment.

Investigation

Initial investigation
The National Transportation Safety Board (NTSB) commenced an investigation, which lasted for 21 months.

Although the flight data recorder (FDR) outer protective case was damaged, the data tape inside was intact and all of the data were recoverable. Five parameters were recorded by the FDR: heading, altitude, airspeed, normal acceleration (G loads), and microphone keying.  The FDR did not record rudder, aileron or spoiler deflection data, which could have aided the NTSB in reconstructing the plane's final moments. The data available proved insufficient to establish why the plane suddenly went into the fatal dive. The NTSB considered the possibilities of a malfunction of the rudder power control unit servo (which might have caused the rudder to reverse) and the effect that powerful rotor winds from the nearby Rocky Mountains may have had, but there was not enough evidence to prove either hypothesis.

The cockpit voice recorder (CVR) was also damaged, but the data tape inside was also intact. However, the data tape had creases in it, resulting in the playback quality being poor. The CVR determined that the pilots made a verbal (and possible physical) response to the loss of control.

The following is an excerpt of the last two minutes Flight 585 CVR, starting two minutes before impact (the full CVR recording started before Flight 585 took off from Stapleton):

Thus, the first NTSB report (issued on December 8, 1992) did not conclude with the usual "probable cause". Instead, it stated:

Intervening events

Following the failure to identify the cause of Flight 585's crash, another Boeing 737 crash occurred under very similar circumstances when USAir Flight 427 crashed while attempting to land in Pennsylvania in 1994.

Renewed investigation and probable cause
The NTSB reopened its investigation into Flight 585 in parallel with the USAir Flight 427 investigation, due to the similar nature of the circumstances.

During the NTSB's renewed investigation, it was determined that the crash of Flight 585 (and the later Flight 427 crash) was the result of a sudden malfunction of the aircraft's rudder power control unit. Another incident (non-fatal) that contributed to the conclusion was that of Eastwind Airlines Flight 517, which had a similar problem upon approach to Richmond on June 9, 1996. On March 27, 2001, the NTSB issued a revised final report for Flight 585, which found that the pilots lost control of the airplane because of a mechanical malfunction. The renewed investigation concluded with a "probable cause" that stated:

In popular culture
The Discovery Channel Canada / National Geographic TV series Mayday dramatized the crash of Flight 585 and the subsequent 737 rudder investigation in a 2007 episode titled Hidden Danger.

The crash is dramatized in the episode "Fatal Flaws" of Why Planes Crash.

See also

 Boeing 737 rudder issues
 Eastwind Airlines Flight 517
 USAir Flight 427
 Alaska Airlines Flight 261
 American Airlines Flight 1
 Northwest Airlines Flight 85

References

External links
Memorial plaque at the crash site in Colorado Springs
 (Archive)
 
 Boeing 737 Rudder Design Defect 
 Airliners.net Pre-crash photos
 Recording of the air traffic control transmissions between the aircraft and Colorado Springs

Transportation in Colorado Springs, Colorado
History of El Paso County, Colorado
1991 in Colorado
Airliner accidents and incidents caused by design or manufacturing errors
Airliner accidents and incidents caused by mechanical failure
Aviation accidents and incidents in the United States in 1991
Airliner accidents and incidents in Colorado
585
Accidents and incidents involving the Boeing 737 Original
March 1991 events in the United States
Aviation accidents and incidents caused by loss of control